Michal Jakubek (born 1 June 1990) is a professional Slovak footballer who currently plays for Moravian–Silesian Football League club FK Hodonín as a forward.

Club career
In 2019, Jakubek joined FK Hodonín.

References

External links
 
 Futbalnet profile
 Eurofotbal profile

1990 births
Living people
Slovak footballers
Association football forwards
MFK Skalica players
FK Hodonín players
2. Liga (Slovakia) players